A dwarf is a type of supernatural being in Germanic folklore, including mythology. Accounts of dwarfs vary significantly throughout history; however, they are commonly, but not exclusively, presented as living in mountains or stones and being skilled craftsmen. In early literary sources, only males are explicitly referred to as dwarfs, although they are described as having sisters and daughters, while both male and female dwarfs feature in later saga literature and folklore. Dwarfs are sometimes described as short; however, scholars have noted that this is neither explicit nor of relevance to their roles in the earliest sources.

Dwarfs continue to feature in modern popular culture such as in the works of J.R.R. Tolkien and Terry Pratchett, where they are often, but not exclusively, presented as distinct from elves.

Etymology
According to Vladimir Orel, the English noun and its cognates ultimately descend from Proto-Germanic . A different etymology of dwarf traces it to Proto-Germanic , with the r sound being the product of Verner's Law. Anatoly Liberman connects the Germanic word with Modern English dizzy, suggesting a link between the etymology and their role in inflicting mental diseases on humans, similar to some other supernatural beings in Germanic folklore such as elves.

For forms earlier than the Proto-Germanic reconstruction, the etymology of the word dwarf is highly contested. Scholars have proposed theories about the origins of the being by way of historical linguistics and comparative mythology, including the idea that dwarfs may have originated as nature spirits, as beings associated with death, or as a mixture of concepts. Competing etymologies include a basis in the Indo-European root  (meaning "damage"), the Indo-European root  (whence, for example, modern English "dream" and German  "deception"), and scholars have made comparisons with Sanskrit  (a type of "demonic being").

Modern English has two plurals for the word dwarf: dwarfs and dwarves. Dwarfs remains the most commonly employed plural. The minority plural dwarves was recorded as early as 1818. However, it was later popularized by the fiction of philologist and legendarium author J. R. R. Tolkien, originating as a hypercorrective mistake. It was employed by Tolkien for some time before 1917. Regarding his use of this plural, Tolkien wrote in 1937, "I am afraid it is just a piece of private bad grammar, rather shocking in a philologist; but I shall have to go with it."

Attestations

Eddic sources

Terminology
The partial overlap of dwarfs in Eddic sources with elves is supported by the names of dwarfs recorded in the Dvergatal section of Völuspá, which include Álfr ('Elf'), Gandálfr ('Wand-elf'), Vindálf ('Wind-elf'). Dvergatal further lists Yngvi - a name of the god Freyr who was given Álfheimr, the home of the elves, to rule according to Grímnismál.

Notable Eddic dwarfs

 Andvari, a shapechanging dwarf featuring in the Völsung cycle who is extorted out of his treasure by Loki.
 Fjalar and Galar, two brothers who murder Kvasir and brew the mead of poetry from his blood.
 Brokkr and Sindri, brothers who craft Draupnir, Gullinbursti and Mjölnir for the gods.
 Sons of Ívaldi, brothers who craft Gungnir, Skíðblaðnir and Sif's hair for the gods.
 Alvíss, a dwarf who requested the hand in marriage of Thor's daughter Þrúðr. Thor outwits him by keeping him talking until daybreak whereupon he turns to stone
 Litr, a dwarf kicked by Thor into Baldr's funeral pyre for an unclear reason.

Germanic heroic legend and sagas

Continuity with older beliefs
After the Christianization of the Germanic peoples, dwarfs continued in the folklore of Germanic-speaking areas of Europe and in the literary works produced there. Opinions on the degree of continuity in beliefs on dwarfs before and after Christianisation differ greatly. Some scholars, such as Rudolf Simek, propose that the folk beliefs remained essentially intact in the transitional period, making later sources greatly informative on pre-Christian Germanic religion, while others such as Schäfke on the other hand arguing that there is no resemblance between Eddic and skaldic dwarfs and those in later sources.

Old Norse
Dwarfs feature throughout both fornaldarsögur and riddarasögur. In Völsunga saga which details the events that unfold after Loki extorts treasure out of the dwarf Andvari, to pay the wergild for his killing of Ótr, a being whose brother Regin is also described in some sources as either resembling or being a dwarf. In Hervarar saga ok Heiðreks, the sword Tyrfing is forged, and subsequently cursed, by a dwarf named Dvalinn, and another named Dulin in the Hauksbók manuscript.

Middle High German
In German literature, many dwarfs can make themselves invisible, typically via a "Tarnkappe" (cloak of invisibility), which has been suggested to be an ancient attribute of dwarfs. Depending on the story, they may be hostile or friendly to humans.

The dwarf Alberich plays a vital role in the Nibelungenlied, where he guards the Nibelung's treasure and has the strength of twelve men. He is defeated by Siegfried and afterwards serves the hero. In Ortnit, Alberich seduces the queen of Lombardy, thereby spawning the hero Ortnit. The dwarf then aids Ortnit in his adventures after revealing to the hero that he is his father. In Das Lied vom Hürnen Seyfrid, Siegfried is aided by the dwarf Eugel, who is son of the dwarf king Nibelung, originator of the Nibelung's treasure.

The hero Dietrich von Bern is portrayed in adventures involving dwarfs. In Laurin, he fights against the dwarf King Laurin at the dwarf's magical rose garden. He later rescues a woman whom Laurin had kidnapped. A similar plot occurs in the fragmentary poem Goldemar. In Virginal, Dietrich rescues the dwarf queen Virginal from a force of invading heathens.  The dwarfs Eggerich and Baldung play a role in aiding Dietrich in the poem Sigenot: Baldung gives Dietrich a magical gem that prevents him from being bitten when thrown into a snake pit, whereas Eggerich helps Dietrich and Hildebrand escape. In the Heldenbuch-Prosa, a dwarf takes Dietrich out of this world after the death of all the other heroes, a role given to Laurin in some different versions of Dietrich's end.

Modern period
Dwarfs feature in the modern folklore of Germanic-speaking regions of Europe such as the Simonside Dwarfs in Northumberland, who are sometimes believed to use lights to lure people off paths, akin to a will-o'-the-wisp.

Some dwarfs in modern folklore have been argued to belong to a wider group of smith-beings living within hollow mountains or in caves such as the Grinkenschmied. Mounds in Denmark can also be referred to by names derived from their inhabitants such as 'smedsberg' or 'smedshoie' ('smith's hill' or 'smith's mound'). Anglian folklore tells that one can hear a forge from within a mound and feel furnace fires under the earth, while in Switzerland, the heat can be attributed to the underground kitchens of dwarfs. In one example, the heat of the furnace is believed to increase the fertility of the soil .

Attributes and themes

Diversity and vagueness
Rather than existing a "true" single nature of a dwarf, they vary in their characteristics, not only across region and time, but also between one another in the same cultural context and some are capable of changing their form entirely. The scholar Ármann Jakobsson notes that accounts of dwarfs in the Eddas and the section of Ynglinga saga regarding Sveigðir lack prominence in their narratives and cohesive identity. Based on this he puts forward the idea that dwarfs in these sources are set apart from other beings by their difficulty to be defined and generalised, ultimately stemming from their intrinsic nature to be hidden and as the "Other" that stands in contrast with humans.

Appearance

Form and colour

Based on the etymology of dwarf, it has been proposed that the oldest conception of a dwarf was as exclusively a formless spirit, potentially as in the case of disease-causing dwarfs, however, this view is not seen in the oldest manuscript accounts. In the quotation of Völuspá in the Prose Edda, the dwarfs emerge as beings with human form, while in the Codex Regius manuscript the first two dwarfs created either dwarfs or people with human forms. The prose of the Ynglinga saga describes a dwarf sitting, standing and speaking, leading to the proposal that at the time of writing, dwarfs were believed to, at least sometimes, have a human-like form. It nonetheless appears to have been recognised as a dwarf, however that may have been due to its behaviour as opposed to its physical appearance. In skaldic and Eddic sources, it has been noted that their roles are what define them rather than their physical appearance, which has no great relevance.

In contrast, Snorri describes dökkálfar (which are typically identified as dwarfs) as "blacker than pitch". Alvíss is described by Thor in Alvíssmál as being as unsuitable to wed his daughter Þrúðr as he was "pale about the nostrils" and resembled a þurs.

In Middle High German heroic poetry, most dwarfs have long beards, but some may have a childish appearance.

Size
In the early Old Norse sources, dwarfs are typically described vaguely, with no reference to them being particularly small; in the legendary sagas and later folklore, however, they are often described as being short.

Norðri, Suðri, Austri and Vestri are four dwarfs, potentially depicted as four anthropomorphic figures on the hogback stone in Heysham in Lancashire, that according to the Prose Edda each hold up a corner of the sky, that was fashioned from the skull of Ymir. It has been suggested that this would imply that dwarfs could be very tall, however, it has been noted that the sky could have been conceived of as being close to the earth at the horizon. Regin, a figure identified as either a dwarf or resembling a dwarf, is a similar size to the hero Sigurd on both the Ramsund carving and carvings from the Hylestad Stave Church. Some names suggest a small size such as Nori and Nabbi, which have been translated as "tiny" and "little nub" respectively, however it has been argued that this was not necessarily the general rule.

Not all late sagas involving dwarfs describe their size but all that do describe them as short. In some German stories, the dwarf takes on the attributes of a knight but is most clearly separated from normal humans by his small size, in some cases only reaching up to the knees. Despite their small size, dwarfs in these contexts typically have superhuman strength, either by nature or through magical means. Anatoly Liberman suggests that dwarfs may have originally been thought of as lesser supernatural beings, which became literal smallness after Christianization.

Shape changing
Diversity in appearance is not only seen between dwarfs throughout time and region but also with individual dwarfs, who can be capable of changing their shape and size, such as in Reginsmál, in which the dwarf Andvari lived as a pike in the water due to curse from a Norn, however, could also take on a human-like shape. In later German folklore, the Zwergkönig ('Dwarf King') is a tiny being but is capable of becoming enormously tall at will.

Gender and family groups

In Eddic and skaldic sources, dwarfs are almost exclusively male; for example, in the Dvergatal, every dwarf named is male. Some scholars have proposed that female dwarfs were not believed to exist, however they are likely attested in charms dating to the early medieval period and are explicitly described in later saga material. Dwarfs are also widely referenced in these sources as having family relations to others such as being brothers and sons. Pairs or groups of brothers are seen relatively abundantly in Eddic contexts, as with the sons of Ívaldi, and Fjalarr and Galarr.

This interpretation is paralleled in Wið Dweorh XCIIIb (Against a Dwarf XCIIIb) in which a harmful dwarf's sister is called to prevent him from causing an afflicted person's illness.

In Fáfnismál, the worm Fáfnir refers to some Norns as "Dvalinn's daughters", while in the Prose Edda, they are described as "of the dwarfs' kin". As Norns are also female, this could mean that dwarfs were conceived of by the author of the poem as able to be female, it is not clear whether either their mother (or mothers) are dwarfs, or if they themselves are considered dwarfs just because they are descended from dwarfs.

It has been noted that it may not be that female dwarfs did not exist in the folklore of this period, only that no explicit references to them survive in preserved narratives. It has been proposed this may be because narratives typically centre on the gods rather than dwarfs and that female dwarfs were not conceived of as of great relevance to the gods, given their primary interest in obtaining goods from dwarfs, which does not depend on their gender. Humans, being of lower power and status, cannot control dwarfs as easily and require alternative strategies to obtain treasures from them, potentially explaining why female dwarfs are more prominent in saga literature.

Female dwarfs feature in the late Gibbons saga, Bósa saga and Þjalar-Jóns saga, where they are referred to by the term "". In these cases, female dwarfs are only mentioned alongside males and are not independently important to the plot. Beyond Svama, the named  in Þjalar-Jóns saga, the only other explicitly named dwarf woman in saga literature is the daughter of Sindri in Þorsteins saga Víkingssonar, Herríðr. In saga material, dwarf children are also seen. In Þorsteins saga Víkingssonar and Egils saga einhenda ok Ásmundar berserkjabana, central characters help these children and are rewarded in return by the father with treasures. Conversely, in Sigurðar saga þǫgla, the human Hálfdan is cursed after he throws a rock at a dwarf child, breaking its jaw and is subsequently visited by the child's father in a dream who curses him. Hálfdan's brother later gives the child a gold ring to atone for the harm and is rewarded by the father, once more in a dream. Together, this suggests that dwarfs could be conceived of as loving and protective of their children by the saga authors. In Þorsteins saga Víkingssonar, this family love is extended to the human Hálfdan who develops a fostering relation with the dwarf Litr, likely with Hálfdan as the foster son.
 
In German heroic legend, male dwarfs are often portrayed as lusting after human women. In contrast, female dwarfs seek to possess the male hero in the legends.

Craftsmanship and treasure
In Eddic sources dwarfs are attributed with creating magical treasures for the gods such as Mjölnir, Sif's hair, Draupnir,  Gullinbursti, Skíðblaðnir, Gleipnir and Gungnir, while in Sörla þáttr they craft Brísingamen for Freyja. They further created the Mead of Poetry from the blood of Kvasir, which grants skill in poetry to those who drink from it. According to Skáldskaparmál, due to the role of dwarfs in crafting the drink, poetry can be referred to by kennings such as "the Billow of the Dwarf-Crag", "Thought's Drink of the Rock-Folk", "the Drink of Dvalinn", "the Dwarves' ship" and the "Ale of the Dwarves". John Lindow noted that stanza 10 of the Poetic Edda poem Völuspá can be read as describing the creation of human forms from the earth and follows a catalogue of dwarf names; he suggests that the poem may present Ask and Embla as having been created by dwarfs, with the three gods then giving them life.

In Eddic and some saga sources, rather than being exchanged, items of value move from dwarfs to others, often through extortion. This has been suggested to be a key differentiator between dwarfs and elves in pre-Christian Germanic religion, who maintain reciprocal and positive relationships with gods and humans; Kormaks saga describes how food was to be shared with elves to heal sickness and Austrfararvísur records an álfablót being held around the early 11th century in Sweden. Dwarfs on the other hand according to these sources are asocial and there are no records of them receiving blóts or other gifts in this period.

Dwarfs maintain their roles as reluctant donors of their possessions in some later Old Norse legends such as Volsunga saga and Hervarar saga ok Heiðreks, where they are forced to give up Andvaranaut and Tyrfing respectively. Some legendary and romance sagas diverge from this, with dwarfs acting friendlily and helpfully, however, this is attributed to their lateness and likely do not represent perceptions that predate Christianisation. Typically in these later sagas, fighting dwarfs is considered dishonourable, in contrast to other beings such as dragons. Receiving help from a dwarf, however, such as being healed or given a treasure, was not seen as problematic; it has been proposed that the worldview of the saga writers was that a hero is not defined by achieving deeds alone, but by being able to both give and accept help.

In German legends, they also possess other magical objects and often appear as master smiths.

Association with mountains and stones

The Codex Regius version of Völuspá records that dwarfs were produced out of the earth, while in the Prose Edda they form like maggots in the flesh of Ymir, which became the earth. Beyond this, in early Old Norse sources, there is ambiguity between whether dwarfs live within stones or whether they are themselves stones. In Ynglingatal stanza 2 and the accompanying prose in the Ynglinga saga, a dwarf lures King Sveigðir into an open stone which closes behind them, whereupon he is never seen again. Ynglingasaga also describes this dwarf as being afraid of the sun, akin to in Alvíssmál, where the poem's eponymous dwarf is turned to stone sunlight.

In German legends, they typically live inside of hollow mountains, though in some cases, they may live above the ground, while in saga literature, such as Þorsteins saga Víkingssonar they commonly live in individual stones, which could also serve as workshops, such as in the forging of Brísingamen in Sörla þáttr.

It has been proposed by Lotte Motz that the inhabitation of mountains, stones and mounds by dwarfs may be derived from their earlier association with the dead who were frequently buried in mounds and around megaliths.

Causing disease

The term '' can be used in Old English texts to describe an illness; it is commonly used in medical texts derived from Greek or Latin sources, where it is used to gloss symptoms such as fever. The "Dictionary of Old English" divides the definition of  into either "a dwarf or pygmy", or "a fever", however, it has been argued that the distinction between the two meanings may not have been prevalent among Germanic peoples in the Early Middle Ages, due to the close association between the beings and sickness in medicinal charms.

The 8th century Ribe skull fragment, found in Jutland, bears an inscription that calls for help from three beings, including Odin, against either one or two harmful dwarfs. The item's function has been compared to the Sigtuna amulet I and Canterbury charm that seek to drive away a "lord of þursar" that is causing an infection, the latter explicitly with the help of Thor. A similar inscription dating between the 8th and 11th century is found on a lead plaque discovered near Fakenham in Norfolk, which reads "dead is dwarf", and has been interpreted as another example of a written charm aiming to rid the ill person of the disease, identified as a dwarf. The Lacnunga contains the Anglo-Saxon charm  XCIIIb (Against a Dwarf XCIIIb) that refers to a sickness as a  that is riding the afflicted person like a horse, similar to the harmful mare in the later folklore of the Germanic-speaking peoples. Despite the Christian elements in the  charms, such as the saints called upon for help, their foundations likely lie in a shared North-Sea Germanic tradition that includes inscribed runic charms such as those found in Ribe and Norfolk.

The conception of diseases as being caused by projectiles from supernatural beings is widespread in Germanic folklore through time, such as in the phenomenon of elfshot, in Wið færstice, where they are thrown by elves, Ēse and witches, and in the Canterbury charm in which an infection is caused by the 'wound-spear' used by the "lord of þursar".

Toponomy
Placenames derived from dwarf or cognate:

England
 Dwarriden (Dwarf dale) – Valley in the West Riding of Yorkshire

Influence on popular culture

Dwarfs feature in modern tellings of folklore such as Walt Disney's 1937 film based on the folktale recorded by the Brothers Grimm.

Most dwarfs in modern fantasy fiction closely follow those of J. R. R. Tolkien's The Hobbit and The Lord of the Rings, where the dwarves (Tolkien's spelling) were distinguished from elves: most modern fantasy has continued this distinction. Dwarfs are also present in other fantasy literature such as C. S. Lewis's Narnia stories,  Terry Pratchett's Discworld and the Artemis Fowl novels by Eoin Colfer.

The emergence of fantasy video games has led to differing depictions and interpretations of dwarfs. In the universe of The Elder Scrolls, "dwarves" (or Dwemer) are presented as a race of subterranean elves, whose culture was centred around science and engineering, that differs from Tolkiens conceptualisation, in that they are not particularly short, and are extinct. Other games like Dragon Age and Warcraft present an image of dwarfs as stout, bearded mountain dwellers, separate from Elves. Warhammer retains the Dungeons & Dragons dichotomy between Dwarves and Dark Dwarves, referring to the latter as Chaos Dwarfs.

See also
 Gnome
 Krasnoludek
 Smithing gods

Notes

References

Bibliography

Primary

Secondary
 
 
 
 
 
 
 
 
 
 

 
 
 
 
 
 
 
 
 
 
 
 
 
 
 
 
 
 
 
 

 
Mining folklore
Ymir
Fairy tale stock characters